Dawn Sutter Madell is a music writer and co-owner of Agoraphone a company that does music supervision, licensing, and original music production for commercials, television and film. 

Madell has worked with brands such as FedEx, Samsung, and Audi. She was the music supervisor for Ma Rainey's Black Bottom. Branford Marsalis called her "the music whisperer for the film." Madell's Agoraphone was the music company for Hewlett-Packard's television commercial "Jane" which won multiple awards in 2016 including a CLIO and the Cannes Lions International Festival of Creativity. They also did the music for Audi's 2016 Super Bowl ad featuring David Bowie's song Starman.
Her musical score for The World Made Straight was called "the perfect blend of Appalachian folk music and country tunes."

Madell often discusses music licensing issues in the larger world, explaining the ins and outs of commercial licensing.

Personal life
Madell married Josh Madell, co-owner of Other Music, in May 1999. They live in Brooklyn.

References

External links
 Agoraphone

Music licensing
Year of birth missing (living people)
Living people